Daniel Kinumbe (born March 15, 1999) is a Canadian professional soccer player who plays as a left-back for HFX Wanderers.

Club career

Montreal Impact
Kinumbe signed with Montreal Impact affiliate Ottawa Fury on August 6, 2018. He made his professional debut four days later against Nashville SC in a 2–0 defeat for the Fury. After the 2018 season, the Fury would announce that Kinumbe would not return to the team for the 2019 season.

On November 16, 2018, Kinumbe sign a home grown contract with the Montreal Impact.

On February 13, 2019, Ottawa Fury FC announced that Kinumbe would be returning on loan for the 2019 season. Kinumbe would have his option for the 2020 season declined by the Impact, ending his time with the club after two seasons.

HFX Wanderers
On January 15, 2020, Kinumbe signed a multi-year deal with Canadian Premier League side HFX Wanderers.

International career
Born in Israel and raised in Canada, Kinumbe is of Congolese descent and was called to a DR Congo U-20 football camp in March 2018.

In 2017, he was called up to a Quebec-Canada U20 team to play friendlies against Haiti U20, who were preparing for the 2017 Jeux de la Francophonie.

In May 2018 Kinumbe was called up to the Canadian under-21 team for the 2018 Toulon Tournament. He played in all four of Canada's matches at the event. On October 24, 2018, Kinumbe was named to the Canadian U20 squad for the 2018 CONCACAF U-20 Championship. Kinumbe was named to the Canadian U-23 provisional roster for the 2020 CONCACAF Men's Olympic Qualifying Championship on February 26, 2020.

Honours
Montreal Impact
 Canadian Championship: 2019
HFX Wanderers
 Canadian Premier League
Runners-up: 2020

Career statistics

References

External links

1999 births
Living people
Association football defenders
Canadian soccer players
Footballers from Tel Aviv
Canadian people of Democratic Republic of the Congo descent
Naturalized citizens of Canada
CF Montréal players
Ottawa Fury FC players
HFX Wanderers FC players
USL Championship players
Major League Soccer players
Canadian Premier League players
Canada men's youth international soccer players
Black Canadian soccer players